Sir William Peterson,  (29 May 1856 – 4 January 1921) was a Scottish academic and the Principal of McGill University from 1895 to 1919.

Biography
Born in Edinburgh, the fifth son of John Peterson and Grace Mountford Anderson, Peterson graduated from the University of Edinburgh in 1875 and Corpus Christi College, Oxford in 1879. In 1882, he became the first principal of the recently established University College, Dundee, a position he would hold until 1895. Peterson, despite being aged only 26, won this position ahead of three other candidates including John Edward Aloysious Stegall, who would go on to serve as Professor of Mathematics and Natural Philosophy at University College, Dundee. Stegall seems to have resented this for he failed to mention Peterson in the lengthy account of the college's early years which he produced fifty years later.

A Latinist and a classical scholar, Peterson, while enjoying academic argument, disliked the politics of academia, particularly the issues arising from the complex relationship between University College and the University of St Andrews.

From 1895 to 1919, he was the Principal of McGill University in Montreal, Canada. Despite being in Canada for almost 25 years he considered himself an exile and always returned to the UK for his summer vacation. He suffered a stroke in Montreal in 1919.

Peterson was appointed a Companion of the Order of St Michael and St George (CMG) during the visit to Canada of TRH the Duke and Duchess of Cornwall and York (later King George V and Queen Mary) in October 1901.  In 1915, he was made Knight Commander (KCMG) of the same order.

In 1919, he returned to England and died at Hampstead Heath in 1921.

References

External links
 
 
 
 

1856 births
1921 deaths
Academics of the University of Dundee
Academics of the University of St Andrews
Alumni of the University of Edinburgh
Alumni of Corpus Christi College, Oxford
Canadian Knights Commander of the Order of St Michael and St George
Academics from Edinburgh
Principals of McGill University
Principals of the University of Dundee
Scottish classical scholars
Scottish knights